Sand couch is a common name for several plants and may refer to:

 Sporobolus virginicus